Ragnar Wikström (22 January 1940 – 23 July 2007) was a Finnish figure skater. As a singles skater, he was a two-time Nordic champion (1963–64) and a nine-time Finnish national champion (1957–58, 1960–64, 1967, 1969), representing HSK. Wikström also competed in pair skating, becoming the 1962 national pairs champion with Eeva Sjögren.

Born in Kokkola, where his family had evacuated due to World War II, Wikström lived most of his life in Helsinki. He studied at the Helsinki University of Technology, graduating with an engineer's degree in 1964, and became a member of the Finnish Geotechnical Society. He had two children with his wife and was related to Walter Jakobsson, the 1920 Olympic pair skating champion, on his mother's side. Wikström died in July 2007 at age 67.

Competitive highlights

Single skating

Pair skating with Sjögren

References 

1940 births
2007 deaths
Finnish male single skaters
Finnish pair skaters
People from Kokkola
Sportspeople from Helsinki